The Conservatory of Dance is a ballet school in Rocklin, California, USA and is also the official ballet school and training space for Ballet Rejoice Christian dance company.

Important people
 Sarah Russel, Owner and Director
 Tessa White, Founder and former owner

External links
The Conservatory of Dance website

Education in Placer County, California
Ballet schools in the United States
Dance schools in the United States
Dance in California